"Called Out in the Dark" is a song by Scottish-Northern Irish rock band Snow Patrol. The track was released as the first single from the band's sixth studio album Fallen Empires on 2 September 2011. It was made available both independently and on an EP with three other tracks from Fallen Empires. "Called Out in the Dark" was shortlisted for Meteor Choice Music Prize Irish Song of the Year 2011. A version of the track also exists which is remixed by Norman Cook.

Background and writing 
The song was written by the band's frontman Gary Lightbody and produced by Jacknife Lee, who has worked on their previous three albums.  It was recorded in Topanga Canyon in Los Angeles. The single premiered on Zane Lowe's Radio 1 show on July 21, 2011 and was released on September 2, 2011.

The song, along with other tracks on Fallen Empires, finds Snow Patrol venturing into dance territory. Lightbody told The Sun: "I've always DJed and dance music has always been a big part of our lives, but it's never really been part of the music. So we just let go a little bit this time."

Composition 
Beginning with an underlying, steady acoustic guitar riff that runs relentlessly throughout the track, quickly followed by a dancelike drumbeat which boldly kicks in alongside Gary Lightbody’s distinct vocals declaring, 'it's like we just can't help ourselves cause we don't know how to back down.' "As the kids took back the parks," Lightbody sings, "You and I were left with the streets." The song builds momentum and reaches a climax with a striking, textured, electronic heavy chorus, 'we are listening and we are not blind, this is your life, this is your time.' The song aptly ends with the repeating guitar riff and its accompanying drum riff.

Critical reception 
The song received mostly mixed reviews from critics. Mike Haydock from BBC Music wrote that the song "is a pure mistake of style over substance: a song that has the traditional Snow Patrol shape, dominated by Gary Lightbody's vocal, but where the guitars have been binned just for the sake of it, just to try something 'new'. It sounds too try-hard and trite." Priya Elan from NME wrote a negative review of the track, saying that "it is wall-less, minimalist song in the worst sense of the word." He also criticized the chorus, writing that "is perhaps more disappointing than the verses, because it finds the band dropping the football stadium-like anthems for something that is not unlike the fey, coffee shop electronics that could be found on The Feeling's last album." He also commented about the vocal performance of the band's vocalist, writing that "as Lightbody goes into falsetto, he sounds like he's trying to do a blue-eyed, Will Young impression, but ends up sounding far too studied." Neil Ashman from Drowned in Sound wrote that "it would be a stretch to call the splashes of synth colour and buzzing basslines of ... 'Called Out in the Dark' anything more than cosmetic additions to tuneful, but unremarkable guitar pop."

A positive review came from Cherwells Susan Yu, who wrote that "it is a delightful, electronica infused, powerful gem of a song." Simon Gage from Daily Star also wrote a positive review, saying that the song "has a slight bounce."

Music video
A music video to accompany the release of "Called Out in the Dark" was first released onto YouTube on 17 August 2011 at a total length of four minutes and twenty-four seconds. With a dance choreographed by Noémie Lafrance, it features appearances by Tara Summers and Jack Davenport. Brett Simon directed the music video.

The music video, centered around a video shoot, sees Gary Lightbody (as stand-in), amongst dancers and the singer portrayed by Davenport, make a nuisance of himself on the set of the shoot. Lightbody tries hard to take part in the video and Tara Summers (director) precludes him from doing so. By the end of the video, the dancers are down to their underwear and Lightbody has grabbed a hold of the camera as it cranes out.

Track listing

Chart performance

Weekly charts

Year-end charts

Certifications

Release history

References

External links
 

2011 singles
Snow Patrol songs
Indietronica songs
Songs written by Gary Lightbody
2011 songs
Song recordings produced by Jacknife Lee
Music videos directed by Brett Simon